The Mussau triller (Lalage conjuncta) is a smaller member of the cuckooshrike family, Campephagidae.  It was formerly considered a subspecies of the varied triller. It is found on the St Matthias Islands in the Bismarck Archipelago.

References

Taylor, P.B. 2005. Family Campephagidae (cuckoo-shrikes). Pages 40–122 in J. del Hoyo, A. Elliott, and D.A. Christie (editors), Handbook of the birds of the world. Volume 10. Cuckoo-shrikes to thrushes. Lynx Edicions. Barcelona.

Mussau triller
Birds of New Ireland Province
Mussau triller